The 2022–2023 mpox outbreak in Brazil is a part of the ongoing outbreak of human mpox caused by the West African clade of the monkeypox virus. The outbreak was first reported in Brazil on 9 June 2022 when a man in São Paulo was registered as the country's index case.

Background

Transmission 

A large portion of those infected were believed to have not recently traveled to areas of Africa where mpox is normally found, such as Nigeria, the Democratic Republic of the Congo as well as central and western Africa. It is believed to be transmitted by close contact with sick people, with extra caution for those individuals with lesions on their skin or genitals, along with their bedding and clothing. The CDC has also stated that individuals should avoid contact and consumption of dead animals such as rats, squirrels, monkeys and apes along with wild game or lotions derived from animals in Africa.

In addition to more common symptoms, such as fever, headache, swollen lymph nodes, and rashes or lesions, some patients have also experienced proctitis, an inflammation of the rectum lining. CDC has also warned clinicians to not rule out mpox in patients with sexually transmitted infections since there have been reports of co-infections with syphilis, gonorrhea, chlamydia, and herpes.

Timeline 
Three suspected mpox cases were reported in Brazil on 30 May 2022. On 9 June, a 41-year-old man, who had recently travelled to Spain and Portugal and had been admitted to a São Paulo hospital, tested positive for the virus.

On 29 July, the first death was reported outside of Endemic african countries and the country's first mpox cases in children were confirmed in three kids from São Paulo city.

Statistics

Cumulative cases

Total confirmed cases

Total confirmed Deaths

See also
2022–2023 mpox outbreak
Timeline of the 2022–2023 mpox outbreak
2022–2023 mpox outbreak in Asia
 2022–2023 mpox outbreak in India
2022–2023 mpox outbreak in Europe
 2022–2023 mpox outbreak in France
 2022–2023 mpox outbreak in Germany
 2022–2023 mpox outbreak in the Netherlands
 2022–2023 mpox outbreak in Portugal
 2022–2023 mpox outbreak in Spain
 2022–2023 mpox outbreak in the United Kingdom
2022–2023 mpox outbreak in Canada
2022–2023 mpox outbreak in Peru
2022–2023 mpox outbreak in South Africa
2022–2023 mpox outbreak in the United States
 Mpox in Nigeria
 Mpox in the Democratic Republic of the Congo

Notes

References

Brazil
Mpox
Mpox